Victor Garber (September 14, 1919 – April 7, 2021) was an American politician in the state of Wyoming. He served in the Wyoming House of Representatives as a member of the Republican and Democratic Party. He attended the University of Wyoming and was a businessman in the agriculture industry. Garber turned 100 in September 2019 and died in April 2021 at the age of 101.

References

1919 births
2021 deaths
American centenarians
Members of the Wyoming House of Representatives
Men centenarians
People from Big Horn, Wyoming
University of Wyoming alumni
Wyoming Democrats
Wyoming Republicans